The 1894 Purdue Boilermakers football team was an American football team that represented Purdue University during the 1894 college football season. The team compiled a 9–1 record and outscored its opponents by a total of 188 to 36 in its second season under head coach D. M. Balliet. A. L. Fulkerson was the team captain.

Schedule

Notes

References

Purdue
Purdue Boilermakers football seasons
Purdue Boilermakers football